Mark Leader (1960–2023) was an American-Australian basketball player and coach. He played college basketball for Western Oregon University before moving to Australia where he played 12 seasons in the National Basketball League (NBL) between 1983 and 1995. He then continued in Australia as a coach. Leader was a two-time NBL champion as a player and won multiple championships as a coach at the state league level.

Early life
Leader was born in Idaho but grew up in Oregon.

College career
Leader attended Western Oregon University between 1980 and 1982. He was the team leader in assists in 1981–82 with 102.

Professional career
Leader moved to Australia in 1982 to play for the Ulverstone Redhoppers in the North West Basketball Union in Tasmania. He made his National Basketball League (NBL) debut with the Devonport Warriors in 1983 and averaged 22.1 points and 10.5 rebounds in his first season. In 1984, he served as the Warriors' player/coach and had his best statistical season, averaging 28.7 points, 14.3 rebounds, 5.7 assists, 2.1 steals and 1.7 blocks.

After the demise of the Warriors, Leader joined the West Adelaide Bearcats in the SA State League and was set to play for the Bearcats NBL team as well but after the team merged with the Adelaide 36ers for the 1985 NBL season, he missed out on a roster spot to Mark Davis.

In 1986 and 1987, Leader played for the Geelong Supercats in the NBL. He averaged 18.8 points and 8.2 rebounds for the Supercats in 1987.

In 1988, Leader joined the North Melbourne Giants and went on to win NBL championships in 1989 and 1994 before retiring following the 1995 season. He was captain of the Giants for their championship in 1994.

Leader was the first player in NBL history to record four triple-doubles.

Coaching career
In 1996 and 1997, Leader served as assistant coach of the North Melbourne Giants under head coach Brett Brown.

Between 1997 and 2000, Leader served as head coach of the Ballarat Miners in the South East Australian Basketball League (SEABL).

Leader returned to the SEABL in 2002, as he coached the Geelong Supercats for eight seasons until 2009. He won three SEABL East championships in a row between 2005 and 2007, and in 2006 he guided the Supercats to the ABA National championship.

In 2015 and 2016, Leader coached the Corio Bay Stingrays in the Big V, winning a championship in 2015.

Personal life
Leader became a naturalised Australian in 1987.

Death
Leader died in January 2023.

References

External links
Aussie Hoopla interview (April 2021) on Spotify

1960 births
2023 deaths
American expatriate basketball people in Australia
American men's basketball players
Australian men's basketball players
Basketball players from Idaho
Basketball players from Oregon
Geelong Supercats players
Guards (basketball)
North Melbourne Giants players
Western Oregon Wolves men's basketball players